Gerda Johanna Marie van der Kade-Koudijs (29 October 1923 – 19 March 2015) was a Dutch athlete who competed at the 1948 Olympics. She won a gold medal in the  4 × 100 m relay, finished fourth in the long jump and was eliminated in a heat of the 80 m hurdles. Two years earlier she won European titles in the 4 × 100 m relay and long jump and finished sixth in the individual 100 m race.

References

External links

1923 births
2015 deaths
Dutch female sprinters
Dutch female hurdlers
Dutch female long jumpers
Olympic athletes of the Netherlands
Olympic gold medalists for the Netherlands
Athletes (track and field) at the 1948 Summer Olympics
Athletes from Rotterdam
Medalists at the 1948 Summer Olympics
European Athletics Championships medalists
Olympic gold medalists in athletics (track and field)
20th-century Dutch women